Fearless Freaks is a 2005 documentary directed by Bradley Beesley and edited by JoLynn Garnes, chronicling the alternative rock band The Flaming Lips.  While the film features cameo appearances by such actors as Adam Goldberg and Christina Ricci, most of the screen time is taken up by interviews with the band members and their families interspersed with clips of the band's recording sessions and live performances.  Wayne Coyne's mother and several of his brothers are prominently featured, as are members of Steven Drozd's family, while Michael Ivins' family receives comparatively little screen time.

The film traces the band from their roots as a local psychedelic punk band to an internationally renowned band that draws celebrities to its performances.  Many of the interviews were filmed in the band's hometown of Oklahoma City, although Wayne Coyne is the only band member still living there.  In addition to the development of the Lips' music and performance, another theme running through the movie is the effect that drugs have had on the band and their families.  A notable scene in the film depicts Steven Drozd preparing to inject himself with heroin, and it is stated that paranoia over Drozd's addiction caused guitarist Ronald Jones to leave the band.  Drugs have also affected the lives of members of both Drozd's and Coyne's families.

Cast 
Wayne Coyne – Himself
Steven Drozd – Himself
Michael Ivins – Himself
Bradley Beesley – Narrator
Beck – Himself
Niels Rasmussen – Poul Power
Steve Burns – Himself
Jonathan Donahue – Himself
Adam Goldberg – Himself
Gibby Haynes of the Butthole Surfers – Himself
Juliette Lewis – Herself
Tyson Meade & Trent Bell of The Chainsaw Kittens
Kelly Peterson – Fan with camera at Coachella
Liz Phair – Herself
"Chan" Marshall (Cat Power) – Herself
Christina Ricci – Herself
Jack White – Himself
Meg White – Herself

External links
Official movie website 

2005 television films
2005 films
American documentary films
2005 documentary films
Rockumentaries
The Flaming Lips video albums
2005 video albums
2000s American films